Strip Search is a 2013 online reality television game show created by Penny Arcade and produced by Bionic Trousers Media (also known as LoadingReadyRun). The show featured twelve artists who competed over thirty-one episodes, with the series' winner receiving a cash prize and integration into the Penny Arcade offices in Seattle for one year.

The show was created as a stretch goal in Penny Arcade's 2012 Kickstarter campaign to remove ads from their website. The show was won by artist Katie Rice, who went on to produce the webcomic Camp Weedonwantcha.

Creation 
In 2012, Penny Arcade launched a Kickstarter campaign with the primary goal of removing ads from their website for a year. The primary goal required $250,000, but there were also stretch goals, including "a sort of 'America's next top webcomic' show" if the campaign reached $450,000. The campaign exceeded this goal and Penny Arcade committed to producing the show, later named Strip Search. Penny Arcade commissioned Bionic Trousers Media, the legal entity behind sketch comedy group LoadingReadyRun, to film, host, and edit the show. The show cost around $250,000 to produce, and was released in 2013.

In interviews, Penny Arcade said that they received over 1,000 applicants, and used a brutal process to cut down to 12 contestants, including assessing whether they felt they would be able to work with the person for a year, and if they would be funny. Krahulik said of filming that "Jerry [Holkins] was bad cop, and I was the asshole,” and prided himself on how many times he made people cry. Holkins said they had to try hard to create drama, especially in a house filled with aspiring artists who all seemed to get along and understand one another; Krahulik said he look at contestants and think, “what’s the meanest thing that I can say.”

While Penny Arcade referred to the series as "Season One", and left filming of that season confident there would be a second season, only one season was ever produced.

Format
Strip Search featured twelve cartoonists, living together for the length of the show, competing for a grand prize of $15,000 and a year working in Penny Arcade's offices, including its production resources. The show used progressive elimination to narrow down the initial group of twelve artists to a final winner. While living in a large pineapple-themed house, the artists were given challenges each episode ranging from creative to legal to physical, with the winner or winners of each receiving a prize.

The winner of the last challenge each day had to choose two of the artists to go head-to-head and compete to stay in the game. Elimination candidates met the Penny Arcade creators, Mike Krahulik and Jerry Holkins, and after selecting two random concepts then created an original comic strip based on fusing the concepts. The winner goes back to the house to continue competing while the loser is eliminated. Several episodes deviated from this format at Krahulik and Holkins' decision, such as eliminating multiple people and returning a previously eliminated contestants.

Contestants

Contestant progress

 The artist won the grand prize.
 The artist won a competitive challenge and nominated two others for elimination.
 The artist won a social challenge.
 The artist was explicitly mentioned as finishing well in the challenge.
 The artist was explicitly mentioned as finishing poorly or losing the challenge.
 The artist won an elimination challenge.
 The artist lost an elimination challenge and was eliminated.
 The artist returned after having been eliminated.

Reception
Multiple reviewers praised the show's friendly, supportive tone, as opposed to trends in other reality TV shows to manufacture and present interpersonal tension and drama.

References

External links
 Penny Arcade YouTube channel
 Official website

YouTube original programming
American non-fiction web series
Kickstarter-funded web series
2013 web series debuts